Kotha is a town and Union Council of Kasur District in the Punjab province of Pakistan. It is part of Chunian Tehsil, and is located at 30°49'0N 74°10'0E with an altitude of 178 metres (587 feet).

References

Kasur District